Joscha Kiefer (born 8 December 1982) is a German actor and best known for his role as Sebastian von Lahnstein on the soap opera Verbotene Liebe (Forbidden Love).

Career
He studied acting for three years in Stuttgart. In 2005 Joscha was seen on the Das Erste-Show Ein Fall für B.A.R.Z.. One year later he had the main role in the motion picture Locked.
He played theater from 2004 to 2006.

Verbotene Liebe
Kiefer joined the cast of the soap opera Verbotene Liebe (Forbidden Love) in fall 2007 as Sebastian von Lahnstein, nephew of patriarch Johannes von Lahnstein. He first appeared on-screen on 26 November 2007. Soon Sebastian got involved with Lydia Brandner, which became a major love story of the show in 2008. However, reviews of the pairing were mixed. After a one-night stand with Lydia's mother Katja—in true soap style—vixen Olivia Schneider became interested in Sebastian. A triangle between Lydia, Sebastian and Olivia was created which ended with Lydia and Sebastian as the only possible outcome despite chemistry between Olivia and Sebastian. Olivia was played by Kristina Dörfer, who would later become Joscha's wife and mother of his daughter Julie Marie. In 2009, Kiefer decided not to renew his contract with the show and left Verbotene Liebe after two years. The role was recast with actor Sebastian Schlemmer taking the role.

SOKO 5113
Eventually, Kiefer became part of the long-running crime drama SOKO 5113 in the newly created role of Dominik Morgenstern. He first appeared in the show's 36th season in the episode "Der Fluch des Osiris", which aired on 15 November 2010. Kiefer is currently in its fourth season with the show. In 2013, Kiefer was also part of a crossover between other shows of the SOKO brand, which was titled SOKO - Der Prozess (SOKO: The trial) and ran as a five-part miniseries for an entire week. However Kiefer took only part in the first of the five episodes.

Private life
Joscha Kiefer is happily married to fellow actress Kristina Dörfer, who he met on the set of Verbotene Liebe. They have a daughter, Julie Marie, who was born in September 2010. The couple married after three years of dating in December 2012. They live together in Munich since Kiefer joined SOKO 5113.

Filmography 
 2005: fabrixx
 2005: Ein Fall für B.A.R.Z.
 2006: Locked
 2007: Kurzschluss der Sonnen
 2007: Lichtzeichenwechsel
 2007–2009: Verbotene Liebe (Forbidden Love) as Sebastian Graf von Lahnstein #1 Episodes 3056–3484
 2009: Stumme Spiegel
 2009: Stillleben
 since 2010: SOKO 5113
 2011: Hubert und Staller
 2011: Um Himmels Willen
 2012: Um Himmels Willen
 2013: SOKO - Der Prozess (part one only)
 2014: Die Kinder meiner Schwester
 2015: Udo Honig - Kein schlechter Mensch
 2015: Der Bergdoktor
 2015: Nobbie Vazquez
 2018: Die Braut meines Bruders
 2020: Alarm für Cobra 11 - Abgründe 
 2020: Alarm für Cobra 11 - Ein langer Weg
 2020: Das Haus
 2020: WaPo Bodensee
 2020: Soko München - Der Countdown 
 2020: Breisgau

Theatre 
 2004: Fuchsquartett (AK Stuttgart)
 2005: Vorstadtträume (Kulturhaus Schwanen, Stuttgart)
 2006: Der nackte Wahnsinn (Theater im Olgaeck, Stuttgart)
 2006: Die Kleinbürgerhochzeit (AK Stuttgart)

Notes 

 Joscha Kiefer Agency
 Joscha Kiefer in Verbotene Liebe

External links 
 Joscha Kiefer Official Website
 
 Joscha Kiefer Agency (German)

Living people
German male stage actors
1982 births
German male soap opera actors